The Ramu is a major river in Papua New Guinea.

Ramu may also refer to:
Nickna
 Ramu languages, a language family
 Ramu (1966 film), a Tamil film
 Ramu (1968 film), a Telugu film
 Ramu (1987 film), a Telugu film
 RAMU (album), by drummer Mickey Hart
 Ramu (actor), Indian film actor in Malayalam films
Ramu (film producer), Indian film producer in Kannada films
 Ramu Upazila, a upazila (subdivision) in Bangladesh
 Ramu (monkey), kept behind bars in India for 5 years on the charge of disturbing communal harmony
 Ramu, nickname of the elephant Thechikottukavu Ramachandran of Peramangalam village in Kerala, India 
 Rabbi Mordechai Willig, whose Hebrew acronym (רמ"ו) is transliterated into English as Ramu

People with the given name
Ramu Tokashiki (born 1991), Japanese women's basketball player
Ramu Annadavascan, Singaporean convicted killer